Stories to Remember was a compilation of 6 animated stories made in the early 1990s.

The Stories
 Noah's Ark (1989)

Voiced by James Earl Jones.

 Beauty & The Beast (1990)

Voiced by Mia Farrow.

 Pegasus, The Flying Horse (1990)

Voiced by Mia Farrow.

 Merlin and the Dragons (1991)

Voiced by Kevin Kline.

 The Snow Queen (1992)

Voiced by Sigourney Weaver.

 The Wild Swans (1994)

Voiced by Sigourney Weaver.

External links
 Info on the Stories from Lightyear Entertainment

Direct-to-video animated films
Films based on Beauty and the Beast
Films based on The Snow Queen
Works based on The Wild Swans